Kowlus (also Romanized as Kowlūs) is a village in Chaybasar-e Sharqi Rural District, in the Central District of Poldasht County, West Azerbaijan Province, Iran. At the 2006 census, its population was 276, in 50 families.

References 

Populated places in Poldasht County